Zaharias is a surname. Notable people with the surname include:

Alexandra Zaharias (born 1929), American ballet teacher
Babe Didrikson Zaharias (1911–1956), American athlete
George Zaharias (1908–1984), American professional wrestler and sports promoter

See also
Zaharia